Cherry on the Cake is a 2012 French-Italian romantic comedy film. It marked the directorial debut of actress Laura Morante, who also co-wrote the screenplay and starred in the film. It was nominated for Nastro d'Argento for best comedy film, while Morante was nominated for David di Donatello for best new director.

Cast   
Laura Morante as Amanda
Isabelle Carré as Florence
Pascal Elbé as Antoine
Samir Guesmi as Maxime
Frédéric Pierrot as Bertrand
Patrice Thibaud as Hubert
Louicilia Clément as Noémie
Ennio Fantastichini as Monsieur Faysal

References

External links 

2012 romantic comedy films
2012 films
Italian romantic comedy films
French romantic comedy films
2012 directorial debut films
Films scored by Nicola Piovani
2010s French films
2010s Italian films